Howard Edward Cross Jr. (born August 8, 1967) is a former professional American football player and current broadcaster. He spent 13 seasons as a tight end for the New York Giants in the National Football League (NFL), and was a member of two Super Bowl teams, Super Bowl XXV in 1991 and appearing in Super Bowl XXXV in 2001. Since 2007, he has served as a broadcaster for the New York Giants radio network, and a broadcaster for the YES Network.

Early life
Cross played football at New Hope High School in New Hope, Alabama. In college, he was a member of the Fellowship of Christian Athletes. He was drafted out of the University of Alabama in the 1989 NFL Draft by the New York Giants in the sixth round.

Career
Over his career, Cross played in a total of 207 games as a Giant, trailing only Michael Strahan's 216 games, and Eli Manning’s 236 games. Cross won a Super Bowl ring with the Giants in Super Bowl XXV when they defeated the Buffalo Bills 20-19. He was the only player on both the 1990 Giants team as well as the 2000 team that lost Super Bowl XXXV to the Baltimore Ravens 34-7.

Although he was known more for his blocking expertise, he finished his career with 201 receptions for 2,194 yards and 17 touchdowns.

Post-playing career
After retiring, Cross moved into broadcasting. He has co-hosted the YES Network's This Week in Football, as well as serving as color commentator alongside John Sterling on the network's Ivy League football telecasts. Cross is also a sideline reporter for the New York Giants Radio Network as well as an analyst on Giants First and 10. He has spent a great deal of time working with youth to help ensure that they stay in school. He currently resides in Northern New Jersey and is a commercial real estate broker in NY/NJ for Cushman & Wakefield; where he works closely with Global Chairman Bruce Mosler.  His son, Howard Cross III, recently committed to the University of Notre Dame to play football in the fall of 2019 and his daughter, Bella Cross, will attend The University of Alabama Honors College.

References

1967 births
Living people
American football tight ends
Alabama Crimson Tide football players
National Football League announcers
New York Giants players
Players of American football from Alabama
Sportspeople from Huntsville, Alabama
YES Network